Big Bald is a mountain in Tennessee and North Carolina, located along the Appalachian Trail. at an elevation of , it is the highest peak in the Bald Mountains, which are part of the larger Blue Ridge Mountains subrange of the Appalachian Mountains.

Description
Big Bald is an Appalachian bald, covered by thick vegetation. It is located on the border between Unicoi County, Tennessee and Yancey County, North Carolina, and is the highest point of the former. The mountain has a 360-degree view from its summit.

References

Mountains of Tennessee
Mountains of North Carolina
Mountains on the Appalachian Trail
Protected areas of Unicoi County, Tennessee
Mountains of Yancey County, North Carolina
Protected areas of Yancey County, North Carolina
Landforms of Unicoi County, Tennessee
Appalachian balds